2004–05 Albanian Cup was the fifty-third season of Albania's annual cup competition. It began on 28 August 2004 with the preliminary round and ended on 11 May 2005 with the final match. The winners of the competition qualified for the 2005-06 first qualifying round of the UEFA Europa League. Partizani were the defending champions, having won their fifteenth Albanian Cup last season. The cup was won by Teuta.

The rounds were played in a two-legged format similar to those of European competitions. If the aggregated score was tied after both games, the team with the higher number of away goals advanced. If the number of away goals was equal in both games, the match was decided by extra time and a penalty shootout, if necessary.

Preliminary round
Games were played on 28 August – 1 September 2004.

|}

First round
All fourteen teams of the 2003–04 Superliga and First Division entered in this round, along with Preliminary Round winners. Games were played on 22–29 September 2004.

|}

Second round
First legs were played on 20 October 2004 and the second legs were played on 27 October 2004.

|}

Quarter-finals
In this round entered the 8 winners from the previous round.

|}

Semi-finals
In this round entered the four winners from the previous round.

|}

Teuta advanced to the final.

Tirana advanced to the final.

Final

References

External links
 Official website 

Cup
2004–05 domestic association football cups
2004-05